Rick Norman (born 25 July 1963) is a former Australian rules footballer who played with North Melbourne and the Brisbane Bears in the Victorian Football League (VFL).

A former Noble Park player, Norman made his league debut against Collingwood in the opening round of the 1985 VFL season. It was a historic occasion as it was the very first time Friday Night Football was played in the VFL. He had just one disposal, having injured his hamstring, and didn't play seniors for the rest of the year.

Norman played 11 games in 1986 and the following season joined the Brisbane Bears, who were making their first ever appearance in the VFL. He played just one game for the Bears, a round four fixture against Fitzroy at Carrara.

He also played football for Morningside in Queensland.

References

1963 births
North Melbourne Football Club players
Brisbane Bears players
Morningside Australian Football Club players
Australian rules footballers from Victoria (Australia)
Living people